Steve Sanghi is the founder and served as chief executive officer of Microchip Technology Inc. since October 1991. He also holds the Executive Chair of the board of directors of the company.

Since this period Steve Sanghi has been replaced by Ganesh Moorthy. as President & Chief Executive Officer.

Before joining the company, Sanghi was Vice President of Operations at Waferscale Integration, Inc., a semiconductor company, from 1988 to 1990. Mr. Sanghi was employed by Intel Corporation from 1978 to 1988, where he held various positions in management and engineering, the most recent serving as General Manager of Programmable Memory Operations.

He was appointed to the board of directors of Mellanox in 2018.

Education 
He has a Masters of Science degree in Electrical and Computer Engineering from the University of Massachusetts Amherst, and a Bachelor of Science Degree in Electronics and Communication from the Punjab Engineering College, Chandigarh, India, which he received in 1975.

References

American technology chief executives
University of Massachusetts Amherst College of Engineering alumni
Living people
Year of birth missing (living people)
Punjab Engineering College alumni